Results from Norwegian football in 1949.

Hovedserien 1948–49

Group A

Group B

Championship final
June 6: Vålerengen-Fredrikstad 1-3

June 12: Fredrikstad-Vålerengen 3-0 (agg. 6-1)

1948–49 First division

District I

District II, Group A

District II, Group B

District III

District IV, Group A

District IV, Group B

District V, Group A

District V, Group B

District VI

District VII

District VIII

Play-off preliminary round
May 26: Djerv 1919 - Jerv 2-1

May 29: Fram - Borg 2-0

June 1: Strømmen - Frigg 1-1

May 29: Jerv - Djerv 1919 2-3 (agg. 3-5)

June 1: Borg - Fram 2-1 (agg. 2-3)

June 8: Frigg - Strømmen 0-2 (agg. 1-3)

Play-off, Group A
June 5: Selbak - Molde 3-0
Ranheim - Kapp 6-2
June 12: Kapp - Selbak 0-1
Ranheim - Molde 2-0
June 19: Selbak - Ranheim
Molde – Kapp

Play-off, Group B
June 5: Årstad - Djerv 1919 3-1

June 12: Strømmen - Årstad 1-0
Fram - Djerv 1919 0-1
June 19: Djerv 1919 - Strømmen 0-4
Fram - Årstad 3-0
June 22: Strømmen - Fram 2-2

Promoted to first division
AIK Lund, Asker, Brumunddal, Bryne, Braatt, Eik,
Falk, Gjøvik SK, Jordal, Kjelsås, Kopervik, Lillestrøm,
Mysen, Os, Rosenborg, Skotfoss, Stag, Stjørdal
and Tistedalen.

Norwegian Cup

Final

Northern Norwegian Cup

Final

National team

References

    
Seasons in Norwegian football